La Première (RTI) is a pioneering terrestrial television channel in Côte d'Ivoire. It was formerly named Radio Télévision Ivoirienne (RTI), (the name of the company operating it) from 1963 to 1983, but in 1983 a new television channel made it necessary for the channel to be renamed to La Première.

History
It was first broadcast on 7 August 1963, established by the then President of the Republic Félix Houphouët-Boigny who wanted to make it an instrument of development.

On 4 August 1966, two studios in Cocody, 100m2 and 400m2 respectively were built with quality equipment. In 1973 the station began broadcasting in color.

Following the launch of a second television channel, CH2 on 9 December 1983, RTI was renamed La Première.

Emissions

Series 
 Ma famille
 Person of Interest
 Scandal
 The Blacklist
 The Wild

References

External links
Official site

Television stations in Ivory Coast
1963 establishments in Ivory Coast
Television channels and stations established in 1963